The Pointing Finger is a 1922 British thriller film directed by George Ridgwell and starring Madge Stuart and Joseph Tozer. It was an adaptation of the novel The Pointing Finger (1907) by "Rita". It was remade as The Pointing Finger in 1933.

Cast
 Milton Rosmer - Lord Rollestone / Earl Edensore 
 Madge Stuart - Lady Susan Silchester 
 Joseph Tozer - Captain Jasper Mallory 
 Teddy Arundell - Danny O'Shea 
 Irene Rooke - Lady Anne Silchester 
 James English - Earl of Edensore 
 Norma Whalley - Mrs. Ebury 
 Gibb McLaughlin - The Monk

References

External links

1922 films
Films directed by George Ridgwell
British black-and-white films
British silent feature films
British thriller drama films
1920s thriller drama films
1922 drama films
1920s English-language films
1920s British films
Silent thriller drama films